The Dahod Habibganj Fast Passenger is a passenger train of the Indian Railways, which runs between Habibganj railway station of Bhopal, the capital city of Madhya Pradesh and Dahod railway station of Dahod in Gujarat.

Arrival and departure
Train no. 59320 departs from Dahod, daily at 05:40 hrs., reaching HabibGanj the same day at 16:20 hrs.
Train no. 59319 departs from HabibGanj daily at 11:50 hrs. from platform no. 3 reaching Dahod the next day at 23:00 hrs.

Route and halts
The important halts of the train are:
 Dahod railway station
 Meghnagar railway station
 Ratlam Junction railway station
 Nagda Junction railway station
 Ujjain Junction railway station
 Maksi Junction railway station
 Shujalpur railway station
 Sehore railway station
 Sant Hirdaram Nagar railway station
 Bhopal Junction railway station
 Habibganj railway station

Coach composite
The train consists of 18 coaches:
 1 first class
 2 sleeper coaches
 4 unreserved
 1 ladies/handicapped
 2 luggage/brake van

Average speed and frequency
The train runs with an average speed of 40 km/h. The train runs on a daily basis.

Loco link
The train is hauled by Vadodara VRC WAM4/WAP4 electric locomotives.

Rake maintenance & sharing
The train is maintained by the Bhopal Coaching Depot. The same rake is used for five trains, which are Indore–Bhandarkund Panchvalley Passenger, Indore–Maksi Fast Passenger, Indore–Ujjain Passenger, Bhopal–Indore Express and Bhopal–Bina Passenger for one way which is altered by the second rake on the other way.

See also
 Habibganj - Dr. Ambedkar Nagar Intercity Express
 Bhopal Junction railway station

References

Transport in Bhopal
Railway services introduced in 1999
Rail transport in Madhya Pradesh
Rail transport in Gujarat
Slow and fast passenger trains in India